Panfilovo is a rural locality (a settlement) and the administrative center of Panfilovskoye Rural Settlement, Novoanninsky District, Volgograd Oblast, in southern Russia. The population was 1,797 as of 2010. There are 27 streets.

Geography 
Panfilovo is located in a steppe on the Khopyorsko-Buzulukskaya Plain, 30 km southeast of Novoanninsky (the district's administrative centre) by road. Krasnaya Zarya is the nearest rural locality.

References 

Rural localities in Novoanninsky District